Levels Chillspot is a Zimbabwean music producer, artist and Zimdancehall chanter. He is co-founder of Chillspot Recordz.

Early life

Born Rodger Tafadzwa Kadzimwe, Levels was born in Murehwa in September 1989. He grew up in Chitungwiza where he had his early education then later moved to Mbare suburb in Harare.

Background

Levels Chillspot grew into prominence when he co-founded one of the most successful Zimdancehall record labels in Zimbabwe, Chillspot Recordz in 2013 which popularised Zimdancehall genre. Through the Chillspot Recordz, Levels's name has become popular in Zimbabwe along with his partner Dj Fantan through continuous credit chanting of their names in hit songs that dominated radio airplay, public events and clubs.

Levels has produced about 30 riddims and some of them have won several awards. He has produced for several top artists including Turbulence, Winky D, I-Octane, Romain Virgo, Charlie Black, Enzo Ishall, Dj Tira, Killer T, Tocky Vibes, Freeman HKD and several other local artists.

Awards

Zimdancehall Awards - Best Producer 2013, 15, 19, 2020 (Nominated 2014, 16, 17 and 2018)
Zimdancehall Awards - Best Collaborative Production 2015
Zimbabwe Music Awards - Best Producer 2021
Star FM Music Awards - Best Producer 2021 (Nominated)

References

Living people
Zimbabwean musicians
1989 births